The de Roquefeuil-Blanquefort family previously named de Blanquefort is a French noble family from Aquitaine and Rouergue whose proven filiation began in 1393 when Jean of Blanquefort married Catherine de Roquefeuil-Anduze. Their son Antoine took his mother's name. The Roquefeuil-Blanquefort family gave several branches. The remaining two branches are Roquefeuil Monpeyroux and Roquefeuil Cahuzac. The Roquefeuil-Blanquefort family is a member of the Society of the Cincinnati.

Origin 
The proven filiation began of the Roquefeuil-Blanquefort family in 1393 when Jean of Blanquefort married Catherine de Roquefeuil-Anduze

La Chesnaye-Desbois writes in the 18th century that according to an ancient memoir Jean de Blanquefort could descend from the youngest member of the family de Roquefeuil who received the lordship of Blanquefort, but there is no evidence for this.

Louis de La Roque writes in Bulletin de la Société héraldique et généalogique de France (1879): In Guyenne there tere were three lordships whose names were Blanquefort, one in Médoc, one in Agenais and the third one near l'Isle-Jourdain. Each could have given its name to a family and it is difficult to know which one was the origin of the de Blanquefort family.

Branches 
Eldest branch (extinct):
Antoine I de Roquefeuil, son of Jean de Blanquefort and Catherine de Roquefeui married Delphine d'Arpajon, he inherited of the baronies of Roquefeuil and Blanquefort.
Jean II de Roquefeuil and his brother Antoine (author of the Padiès branch) took part in the League of the Public Weal but received Louis XI's pardon in February 1478.
Bérenger de Roquefeuil (1448-1530) built Bonaguil, the last and largest castle erected in France. Its construction took place in Saint-Front-sur-Lémance and lasted over 40 years. Bérenger married Anne de Tournel.
Charles de Roquefeuil married Blanche of Montpezat sister of Antoine, Marechal of France
Antoine II married Claude de Peyre in 1555.
Antoine III de Roquefeuil became knight of the Order of Saint Michael in 1570 and the barony of Roquefeuil was erected as marquisate in 1618
Antoine-Alexandre de Roquefeuil died without male descendance.

Branches of Padiès, Bousquet and Montpeyroux:

This cadet branch was created by Antoine de Roquefeuil, brother of Jean II de Roquefeuil and became the main branch after Antoine-Alexandre de Roquefeuil's death. Settled in Montpeyroux the branch owned the castle du Bousquet and included several officers and sailors.
Jacques Aymar de Roquefeuil du Bousquet was hereditary governor of Rodez and lieutenant general of the French Navy
Aymar Joseph de Roquefeuil du Bousquet was governor of Brest, and later vice-Admiral of France in charge of the Levant Fleet
Innocent de Roquefeuil was colonel of the Roquefeuil regiment and took part in the Armée des émigrés

Pierre de Roquefeuil-Montpeyroux took part in the American Revolutionary War through the battle of Ushant and the battle of the Saintes. He was member of the Society of the Cincinnati with two of his cousins.

Branch of Cahuzac :
 Camille of Roquefeuil was a navy officer and a marine governor in the Reunion island. He retired from navy to accomplish the first world circumnavigation after the French Revolution.

There is no presumption of any connection with the name Rockefeller as some would allege,

References

Bibliography 
 </ref>

See also 
 House of Roquefeuil-Anduze
 Bonaguil
 Society of the Cincinnati

History of Occitania (administrative region)
Roquefeuil-Blanquefort